The 1994 World Junior Championships in Athletics were held in Lisbon, the capital city of Portugal, on July 20–24.

Results

Men

Women

Medal table

Participation
According to an unofficial count through an unofficial result list, 1139 athletes from 143 countries participated in the event.  This is in agreement with the official numbers as published.

See also
1994 in athletics (track and field)

References

External links
Results at GBRathletics.com
Results from World Junior Athletics History (WJAH)
 Official results

 
World Athletics U20 Championships
World Junior Championships in Athletics
World Junior Championships in Athletics
International athletics competitions hosted by Portugal
Sports competitions in Lisbon
1990s in Lisbon
July 1994 sports events in Europe